George William Mason (5 September 1913 – 12 August 1993) was an English professional footballer who played as a centre half for Birmingham, Redhill Amateurs, Coventry City and Nuneaton Borough. He also played for England at schools and wartime levels.

He was Coventry's captain when they won the 1936 Division 3 South title. After retiring as a player he ran a pub and later worked for Jaguar, retiring in 1978.

References

1913 births
1993 deaths
English footballers
Birmingham City F.C. players
Coventry City F.C. players
Nuneaton Borough F.C. players
English Football League players
Association football defenders